The Examiner was a newspaper edited by Jonathan Swift from 2 November 1710 to 1714. It promoted a Tory perspective on British politics, at a time when Queen Anne had replaced Whig ministers with Tories.

The newspaper was founded by John Morphew and it was launched by the Tories to counter the press of the Whig party. Among its first editors were philosopher and politician Henry St John, 1st Viscount Bolingbroke, Francis Atterbury, chaplain of King William III, and the poet and diplomat Matthew Prior. Another notable contributor was Delarivier Manley.

In 1711, Swift published the political pamphlet The Conduct of the Allies, attacking the Whig government for its inability to end the prolonged war with France. The incoming Tory government conducted secret (and illegal) negotiations with France, resulting in the Treaty of Utrecht (1713) ending the War of the Spanish Succession.

References

Defunct newspapers published in the United Kingdom
1710 establishments in Great Britain
1714 disestablishments in Great Britain
Publications established in 1710
Publications disestablished in 1714
Toryism